Ben Saïd Abdallah (born 1 September 1924) is a French long-distance runner. He competed in the men's 10,000 metres at the 1948 Summer Olympics.

References

External links
 

1924 births
Possibly living people
Athletes (track and field) at the 1948 Summer Olympics
French male long-distance runners
Olympic athletes of France